Events in the year 1860 in Portugal.

Incumbents
Monarch: Peter V
Prime Minister: António José Severim de Noronha, 1st Duke of Terceira; Joaquim António de Aguiar; Nuno José Severo de Mendoça Rolim de Moura Barreto, 1st Duke of Loulé

Events
1 January - Legislative election.
1 May – Joaquim António de Aguiar takes over as Prime Minister, succeeding António José Severim de Noronha, 1st Duke of Terceira
4 July – Nuno José Severo de Mendoça Rolim de Moura Barreto, 1st Duke of Loulé takes over as Prime Minister, succeeding Joaquim António de Aguiar

Arts and entertainment

Sports

Births

27 May – Manuel Teixeira Gomes, writer and politician (died 1941)

Deaths
8 February – António Augusto Soares de Passos, poet (born 1826)
1 June – José Jorge Loureiro, soldier and politician (born 1791)

References

 
1860s in Portugal
Years of the 19th century in Portugal
Portugal